Polizzi is an Italian surname. Notable people with the surname include:

 Alex Polizzi (born 1971), British television personality
 Alfred Polizzi, (1900–1975), American mobster
 Frank Polizzi (1936-2001), American mobster
 Nicole "Snooki" Polizzi (born 1987), American television personality 
 Olga Polizzi, British hotelier
 Rick Polizzi (born 1958), American television producer and writer

Italian-language surnames